Transformers: Armada, known in Japan as Super Robot Life-Form Transformers: Legend of the Microns, is a Japanese anime series produced by animation studios Actas, Studio Galapagos, and NAS and consists of 52 episodes. The anime was a co-production between Takara and Hasbro and a reboot of the franchise, featuring new concepts. Despite being a Japanese production, the series premiered first in the United States. The series premiered on Cartoon Network on August 23, 2002 at 4 P.M. with a 90-minute movie special, consisting of the first three episodes. Following its premiere, new episodes started coming out on August 30, airing every Friday at 6:30 P.M. In the December issue of Japanese magazine Animage, it was announced that the anime would start airing in Japan on January 10, 2003 on TV Tokyo, with new episodes coming out every Friday at 6 P.M.

The anime focuses on the war between the Autobots and Decepticons, led by Optimus Prime and Megatron respectively.

Transformers: Armada is the first series in the "Unicron Trilogy", named so due to all three anime featuring Unicron as the main antagonist. Transformers: Energon, the second installment in the trilogy, is a direct sequel to Armada and takes places ten years after its conclusion. Transformers: Cybertron, the final installment, shares a thematic connection to the previous series and takes place in its own continuity. This was changed in the English dub which made explicit references to Armada and Energon.

Episode list

References

Lists of anime episodes
Armada